Leviton Manufacturing Company, Inc. is an American manufacturer of electrical wiring equipment in North America. It produces electrical light sockets, receptacles and outlets, switches, dimmers and other lighting control systems, wire, power cables, power cords, wall and ceiling occupancy sensors, wall plates, datacom, and other electrical products. 

Leviton is perhaps most regarded for its Decora wall switch, introduced in 1973. Its flat, low profile form factor was a modern alternative to standard toggle switches in many homes and offices.  Today "Decora" is often used as a generic term for decorative paddle switches regardless of manufacturer, but Decora is still a legally recognized trademark of Leviton.

History

The company was founded in 1906 by Isidor Leviton. He began by manufacturing brass mantle tips for the natural gas lighting infrastructure in New York City. They sold their mantle tips on a pushcart on the Bowery on the Lower East Side of New York City. He also designed a screw-in lampholder for Thomas Edison's electric lamp in 1910, and within ten years the lampholders were being used in nearly every apartment in New York City.

In the 1920s Leviton moved to the neighborhood of Greenpoint, in Brooklyn, and in 1936 the company built its own two square block, four-story factory and warehouse, which still stands today. The following year they acquired the American Insulated Wire Company, adding wire, cables, and cords to their product line.

Leviton sold lighting components to the Laurel Lamp Company between 1946-1981. 

Leviton bought Deal Electric Company in 1950, and Hale Brothers, which was renamed Leviton Canada, in 1953, and started to produce fluorescent lighting.

In 1965, Isidor Leviton's son Harold Leviton was named president and CEO.

Leviton moved its corporate headquarters to Little Neck, in Queens, New York, in 1973.

In September 1999, Leviton acquired stage lighting controller manufacturer NSI Corp. as part of their Lighting Control Division.

Donald Hendler and Stephen Sokolow, two of Harold Leviton's sons-in-law, were named CEO and chairman of the board respectively in December 2007, following the latter's death.

Leviton moved from Little Neck in June 2009 to a slightly smaller but more energy-efficient corporate headquarters in Melville, N.Y.

In 2011, Leviton partnered with Ford Motors to produce their ever-green Electric Vehicle Chargers for Ford Electric Cars. Leviton also partnered with Toyota to manufacture chargers for the Toyota plug-in Electric Vehicles

In 2012, Leviton launched its Universal Dimming device line which dims any dimmable light-emitting diode, compact fluorescent light, or incandescent lightbulb. This results in dramatic energy savings. The company also released its Zipline Fluorescent Energy Retrofit Module, which eliminated retrofit wiring of ballasts.

Leviton acquired Home Automation Inc. in August 2012, and renamed it Leviton Security & Automation.

In October 2013, Leviton acquired UK-based JCC Advanced Lighting.

In October 2015, Leviton introduced its Omnistat 3 Hospitality Thermostat for 'cost-effective control of HVAC, lighting, and electrical loads' increasing HVAC energy efficiency in hotel guest rooms.

Leviton currently has operations in more than 85 countries on 6 continents, and employs approximately 6,500 persons. Its products include over 25,000 devices and systems, which are used both residentially and in businesses.

North American locations
 Leviton Mfg. Company Inc., Melville, NY
 Leviton Mfg. of Canada Ltd., Pointe-Claire, QC
 Leviton Network Solutions, Bothell, WA
 Leviton Lighting & Controls, Tualatin, OR
 Leviton Energy Management, Controls and Automation (EMC&A) – New Orleans, New Orleans, LA
 Leviton Mfg. Co., Morganton, NC
 Leviton S. de R.L. de C.V. Mexico City

Recent awards
2014: Leviton Receives Three EC&M "Product of the Year" Category Awards
2013: Leviton SmartlockPro OBC AFCI Receptacle Recognized as “2013 Best New Home Product” by This Old House Magazine
2012: Home Channel News Golden Hammer Award
2012: Today's Facility Manager magazine Readers’ Choice Award
2012: NECA Showstopper Award

Patent lawsuits
In March 2007, Leviton was sued in United States District Court by Lutron Electronics regarding various dimmers, switches, and wireless lighting control systems. Lutron also filed a complaint with the International Trade Commission alleging that Leviton has produced several patent-infringing products in Mexico and China and then imported them into the United States. The lawsuit was settled with a cross-license of certain of the parties' respective patents.

References

External links
 Leviton's Official Website

Electrical wiring and construction supplies manufacturers
Manufacturing companies based in New York (state)
Companies based in New York City
Companies based in Suffolk County, New York
American companies established in 1906
Manufacturing companies established in 1906
Privately held companies based in New York (state)